An au pair organization is an agency which complies with  (which deals with foreign relations—specifically, au pairs.) This program allows foreign nationals between the ages of 18 and 26 to live with a host American family for one year, with a one-year extension permitted. To comply with the regulations, most au pair organizations hire a local coordinator. Au pair organizations must follow guidelines set forth by the United States Department of State, which include:
 Limiting the participation of foreign nationals in the program to one year (unless legally extended)
 Requiring that all officers, employees, agents, and volunteers be adequately trained and supervised
 Requiring that the au pair is placed with a host family within a one-hour drive of the local organizational representative authorized to act on the sponsor's behalf
 Requiring that each local organizational representative maintain a monthly record of all personal contacts with each au pair and host family for which he or she is responsible
 Requiring that all local representatives contact au pair participants and host families twice monthly for the first two months after placement
 Requiring that local representatives not be responsible for more than 15 families if not employed full-time
 Requiring that each local representative provide adequate support services
 Provide the au pair with child-development and child-safety instruction

Host family requirements
To qualify as a host family, the following requirements mandated by the State Department must be met:
 A parent or other responsible adult must remain home for the first three days after the au pair's arrival
 Child must be at least three months of age, unless a parent or other responsible adult is present
 There must be a written agreement between the au pair and the host family limiting hours worked to 10 hours per day and 30 hours (if in the EduCare program) or 45 hours (otherwise) per week
 Au pair must be provided with a suitable private bedroom
 Host family must interview the au pair by telephone or video chat prior to departure from his or her country
 Host family must be U.S. citizens or legal permanent residents
 Host parents must be fluent in English
 Host family must pay the au pair a weekly stipend of $195.75

Au pair requirements
The U.S. Department of State requires that au pairs are:
 Proficient in spoken English;
 A secondary school graduate or equivalent; and
 Between 18 and 26 years old.
 Capable of fully participating in the program as evidenced by the satisfactory completion of a physical.
 Personally interviewed, in English, by an organizational representative who shall prepare a report of the interview which shall be provided to the host family; and
 Successful in passing a background investigation that includes verification of school, three, non-family related personal and employment references, a criminal background check or its recognized equivalent and a personality profile. Such personality profile will be based upon a psychometric test designed to measure differences in characteristics among applicants against those characteristics considered most important to successfully participate in the au pair program.

Au pair agencies
These are the 15 agencies designated by the State Department to administer the au pair program, although two have the same address:

 20/20 Care Exchange (terminated)
 A.P.EX. American Professional Exchange
 Agent Au Pair
 American Cultural Exchange (Go Au Pair)
 Au Pair 4 Me
 Au Pair International
 Au Pair in America / AIFS
 Au Pair USA (InterExchange)
 AuPairCare
 Cultural Care Au Pair (EF Education First)
 Cultural Homestay International
 EurAupair
 Expert Group International (Expert AuPair)
 GreatAuPair
 USAuPair

See also
Chinese au pairs in the United States

References

External links
State Department Regulations, October 2008
CFR 22 62.31, April 2008
Au pairs
Organizations based in the United States